Kul Sira (also Romanized as Kūl Sīrā; also known as Kūl Sīrāb) is a village in Darreh Kayad Rural District, Sardasht District, Dezful County, Khuzestan Province, Iran. At the 2006 census, its population was 194, in 34 families.

References 

Populated places in Dezful County